Jaroslav Naď (born 21 March 1981, Nitra, Czecho-Slovakia) is a Slovak politician, who has served as Minister of Defence since March 2020, as a nominee of OĽaNO. He specialises in national security issues. He previously worked with Globsec.

Early life
Jaroslav Naď graduated in Political Science at the Matej Bel University in Banská Bystrica in 2007 and received further training at the European Security and Defence College in Brussels. Between 2004 and 2011, Naď worked in various role at the Slovak Ministry of Defense. Later, he was active as a diplomat at the NATO headquarters and with Slovak security think tanks GLOBSEC and the Slovak Security Institute. In 2018, he obtained his PhD from the Armed Forces Academy of General Milan Rastislav Štefánik.

Political career

In 2000, he shortly joined the Direction – Slovak Social Democracy party. In 2018, he became a member of Ordinary People and Independent Personalities (OĽANO), on which list he ran in the 2020 Slovak parliamentary election. After the electoral victory of OĽANO, Naď became the minister of defense.

Controversy

Allegations of nepotism
Naď was linked with accusations of nepotism, when his partner Barbora Túrosová was assigned as the spokeswoman of the Ministry of Interior. She denied the allegations, referring to her long-term journalism career in TA3. Naď was previously linked with nepotism back in 2014, when his brother René was appointed as the Permanent Representation of the Slovak Republic to NATO in Brussels, while Naď was one of the officers at the Ministry of Defence. No verdicts were declared in either of the cases.

References

1981 births
Living people
Politicians from Nitra
Slovak diplomats
21st-century Slovak politicians
Defence Ministers of Slovakia
OĽaNO politicians
Matej Bel University alumni